A partial lunar eclipse took place on Saturday, July 6, 1963 with an umbral eclipse magnitude of 0.70602. The Moon was strikingly shadowed in this deep partial eclipse which lasted 3 hours exactly, with 71% of the Moon in darkness at maximum. A partial lunar eclipse occurs when the Earth moves between the Sun and Moon but the three celestial bodies do not form a straight line in space. When that happens, a small part of the Moon's surface is covered by the darkest, central part of the Earth's shadow, called the umbra. The rest of the Moon is covered by the outer part of the Earth's shadow called the penumbra. It was the second of three lunar eclipses in 1963, the first was a penumbral lunar eclipse on January 9, 1963 and the third and last was on December 30, 1963.

Visibility
The partial eclipse was visible in Southeastern Atlantic, Africa, Europe and western Asia, seen rising over South America, and setting over Asia and Australia.

Related lunar eclipses

Lunar year series

Half-Saros cycle
A lunar eclipse will be preceded and followed by solar eclipses by 9 years and 5.5 days (a half saros). This lunar eclipse is related to two total solar eclipses of Solar Saros 126.

Tritos series 
 Preceded: Lunar eclipse of August 5, 1952
 Followed: Lunar eclipse of June 4, 1974

Tzolkinex 
 Preceded: Lunar eclipse of May 24, 1956
 Followed: Lunar eclipse of August 17, 1970

See also
List of lunar eclipses
List of 20th-century lunar eclipses

Notes

External links

1963-07
1963 in science
July 1963 events